Dennis Bowsher (born April 7, 1983) is an American modern pentathlete. He competed at the 2012 Summer Olympics and finished in 32nd place. Bowsher started training in swimming, and only later changed to pentathlon.

References

External links
 

1983 births
Living people
American male modern pentathletes
Olympic modern pentathletes of the United States
Modern pentathletes at the 2012 Summer Olympics
Sportspeople from Dallas
Modern pentathletes at the 2015 Pan American Games
Pan American Games competitors for the United States
U.S. Army World Class Athlete Program
21st-century American people